Kashinatha Hathwara  (8 May 1951 – 18 January 2018) was an Indian actor and filmmaker who primarily worked in Kannada films. He worked on Hindi and Malayalam movies. With a career spanning over three decades, Kashinath worked in over 40 films carving a niche for himself in comedy genre. He is credited for introducing new talents such as actor Upendra, musician V. Manohar  and director Sunil Kumar Desai alongside many other technicians who went on to become successful in Kannada film industry.

Making his debut as a director through the comedy-drama film Aparoopada Athithigalu (1976), Kashinath came into limelight with the suspense thriller Aparichita (1978). He made his acting debut through the successful film Anubhava (1984). The same film was remade and directed by him in Hindi as Anubhav (1986), making his Bollywood entry. His films generally touched subjects which were often regarded as taboo in the Indian society and thus attracted the tag of being vulgar by some critics. He was more popular for his double entendre dialogues in his films  to the extent that most associated the term "double meaning" with Kashinath and many went to the extent of attributing the decline of Kannada films quality to him. Despite the criticisms faced, his films have influenced the society as well as the industry.

Some of his movie dialogues have entered common lingo; for example the extremely popular phrase of "Mangalooru Manjunatha" (from the film Love Maadi Nodu). Some of his other successful films include Anantana Avantara (1989), Avale Nanna Hendthi (1988), Ajagajantara (1991) and Hendathi Endare Heegarabeku (1995). Kashinath made a prominent return when he was cast as an elderly jail inmate who gets falsely accused in his daughter's death in Tharun Sudhir's Chowka (2017). His last film performance before his death is Olu Muniswamy which got released in 25 May 2018.

Early life
Kashinath was born on 8 May 1951 into a middle class Kannada Brahmin family in Markod, a village near Kundapura,Udupi District. His father G. Vasudeva Rao was a businessman and a trader and mother Saraswathi a homemaker. He was the second son of his parents followed by his elder brother Sathyanarayana and his younger brothers are Dattatreya, Ravi, and Umapathi along with their younger sister Gayathri. He spent his childhood in his birthplace and moved to Bangalore with his father.

Career

Early career and rise to stardom: 1975–1990
During his graduation in Bangalore, Kashinath made a short film titled Slip, "in the year 1971 or 1972". This encouraged him to enroll himself into a filmmaking troupe called "Aseema" along with contemporary filmmaker-actor and his long acquaintance, Suresh Heblikar. In 1976, he borrowed money from his father and co-produced with P.R. Ramadas for his directorial debut Aparoopada Athitigalu, a comedy-drama. His second directorial film Aparichita in 1978 was a suspense thriller starring Suresh Heblikar, M. V. Vasudeva Rao, Sundar Krishna Urs and Shoba brought him wide appreciation and recognition. The film paved the way for many other thriller films and was considered to be the "trendsetter" in Kannada cinema. 

The success of the project made him direct its Hindi version titled as Be-Shaque in 1981, starring Mithun Chakraborty. After a brief hiatus, in 1984, he took up acting career by casting himself in the lead role for the film Anubhava. The film was widely acclaimed and was considered bold during its time of release. The film had its music composed by L. Vaidyanathan with whom he shared a long-lasting rapport and also introduced lyricist-music director V. Manohar through the song "Hodeya Doora O Jothegara". The huge success of the film got him the offer to direct its Hindi remake titled as Anubhav (1986) starring Shekhar Suman and Padmini Kolhapure.

In Malayalam, he directed the same film, titled as Aadhyate Anubhavam (1987). The film found multiple time releases and reached the classic status. Following this, he took up acting assignments offered by other directors and starred in some successful films such as Mithileya Seetheyaru (1988), Avale Nanna Hendthi (1988), Sura Sundaranga (1989), Manmatha Raja (1989) and Avane Nanna Ganda (1989).

His third directorial film Anamika (1987) could not repeat the success of his previous film. However, his next directed film Anantana Avantara (1989) was met with high popularity and success. His socially entertaining romantic films such as Avale Nanna Hendthi (1988) opposite Bhavya, Avane Nanna Ganda (1989) co-starring Sudharani and Chapala Chennigaraya (1990) opposite Kalpana were both commercial and critical success. This back to back success made Kashinath one of the most sought-after actors in the 1980s era.

Later career: 1993–2017
In 1991, he co-produced, directed and acted in the film Ajagajantara. The film costarred Anjana and Srilekha and had music composed by Hamsalekha with the lyrics written by two of his proteges, Upendra and V. Manohar. The comedy-drama film met with commercial success and the same screenplay was adapted in the 1997 released Hindi film Judaai, starring Anil Kapoor, Sridevi and Urmila Matondkar.

After this, barring few films, many films directed, produced or acted by him were commercial failures. In the 1990s, he worked with many popular directors such as H. R. Bhargava, Om Sai Prakash, P. H. Vishwanath, B. Ramamurthy, T. S. Nagabharana and Upendra. In 1993, he acted as himself in the horror-thriller film Shhh directed by Upendra which was a success in the box office.

In 1995, he acted and directed the film Hendthi Endare Heegirabeku alongside Akshata which was moderately successful. His subsequent films such as Baduku Jataka Bandi (1997), Hello Yama (1998), Chor Guru Chandal Sishya (1998), Rambhe Urvashi Menake (1999) and Maava Maava Maduve Mado (2000) failed to impress the box office. His next directorial Meese Hottha Gandasige Demandappo Demandu (1999) based on the popular song line of his previous hit Avale Nanna Hendthi was a failure as well. In 2004, he starred in three films which included Aaha Nanna Thangi Maduve in his direction.

In 2007, he directed and acted in the film Appacchi which became his last directorial until his death in 2018. Later he acted in couple of films in supporting roles such as Aathmeeya (2008), Onti Mane (2010) and 12AM Madhyarathri (2012) along with his son Abhimanyu. 

Kashinath made a comeback in 2016 through Prashant Raj's Zoom starring Ganesh by playing a key supporting role. This was followed up by his acting as one of the jail inmates in Dwarakish Chitra's 50th project Chowka in 2017.

The song "Alladsu Alladsu" featuring him in the film Chowka was widely acclaimed and topped the charts. His final onscreen appearance in Olu Muniswamy was released in 25 May 2018.

He also gifted many new artists to Kannada Film Industry. Some of them are given below.

Films remade in other languages
Films directed by or starring Kashinath were remade in other Indian languages. Aparichita (1978) was remade in Malayalam as Avano Atho Avalo (1979) and in Hindi as Be-Shaque (1981). Anubhava (1984) was remade in Hindi by Kashinath as Anubhav (1986) and in Malayalam as Aadhyate Anubhavam (1987). Avale Nanna Hendthi (1988) was remade in Hindi as Jawani Zindabad (1990) that featured Aamir Khan in Kashinath's role.

Filmography

Death
Kashinath was diagnosed with Hodgkin's lymphoma in mid 2017. He was admitted to the Sri Shankara Cancer Hospital in Bengaluru on 16 January 2018. He died at 7:45 a.m (IST) on 18 January from cardiac arrest.

As filmmaker 
Kashinath came to be regarded as a disciplined and systematic filmmaker with a strong technical knowledge. He would pen down the duration of the film sequences, shot compositions, camera angles and the dialogue flow before execution of a scene. This practice enabled the entire team to stick to the schedule and complete a film within the prescribed timeline and budget.

References

External links 
 

1951 births
2018 deaths
20th-century Indian film directors
Hindi-language film directors
Kannada film directors
Kannada comedians
Male actors in Kannada cinema
Indian male film actors
Indian male comedians
Male actors from Karnataka
20th-century Indian male actors
21st-century Indian male actors
People from Udupi district
Film directors from Karnataka
Deaths from Hodgkin lymphoma
Deaths from cancer in India
Madhva Brahmins